Khorramdarreh, also Romanized as Khorram Darreh, Khorramdareh, and Khorramdarreh; also known as Khorramdarrekh) is a city in the Central District of Khorramdarreh County, Zanjan province, Iran, and serves as capital of the county. At the 2006 census, its population was 48,055 in 12,562 households. The following census in 2011 counted 52,548 people in 15,307 households. The latest census in 2016 showed a population of 55,368 people in 17,345 households. The city has highest literacy rate in Zanjan province. 

Khorramdarreh is home of Minoo industrial group (Food Holding) which is founded by Ali Khosroshahi, grandfather of Dara Khosroshahi. People of Khorramdarreh are mainly active in agriculture sector. Khorramdarreh has one industrial estate which is located near Qazvin-Zanjan highway (north of the highway near Hotel Ghazal).

Agricultural products 
Agricultural products and fruits that are exported abroad and also distributed all over country are:

Beans(pinto, red & white), variants of grape,raisins and grape syrup, walnuts, wheat, variants of apple, pear, apricot, cherry, sour cherry, cow milk, oily seeds and meat.

Tourism 
Khorramdarreh is called green jewel of Zanjan because of its gardens and green fields. Its gastronomy and restaurants(specially Kabab and Ab-goosht) are loved by transit drivers from Türkiye, Eastern Europe, Armenia, Georgia & Azerbaijan. Hiking and Camping in mountains are very common hobbies of its locals and tourists. Khorramdarreh garden alleys (Koucheh-Bagh) in spring and summer host visitors from all over Iran. Family night gatherings in private gardens is a tradition among both elderly and youth.

Khorramdarreh has Province's oldest and most significant human civilization remainders in Tappe-Khalese (Meaning hill Khalese) from 6000 B.C. located in south side of the city within gardens.

References 

Khorramdarreh County

Cities in Zanjan Province

Populated places in Zanjan Province

Populated places in Khorramdarreh County